Geumnam-myeon is township of Sejong City, South Korea.

External links
 Geumnam-myeon 

Towns and townships in Sejong